Zanthoxylum nadeaudii is a species of plant in the family Rutaceae. It is endemic to French Polynesia.

References

Flora of French Polynesia
nadeaudii
Data deficient plants
Taxonomy articles created by Polbot